Le Faubourg de l'Île, formerly known as Centre d'achat Île-Perrot, is an enclosed shopping mall located in Pincourt, Quebec, on Cardinal-Léger Boulevard at the intersection of 101 Cardinal-Léger Boulevard and Exit 35 on Highway 20 (Autoroute du Souvenir).

Le Faubourg de l'Île is named in reference to its location on the island Île-Perrot located on the St-Lawrence River between the island of Montreal and the mainland at the junction of the Ottawa River and the St-Lawrence River (going into the Great Lakes).

Le Faubourg de l'Île is strategically located in Pincourt right at the entrance of the city beside the Taschereau Bridge, a bridge linking Pincourt, on Île-Perrot, to Vaudreuil-Dorion, in the Vaudreuil-Soulanges RMC across the West Channel of the Ottawa River . Cardinal-Léger Boulevard in one of the main commercial artery in Pincourt (the other one being Boulevard de l'Île), crossing the whole city from North to South.

Le Faubourg de l'Île is located  near the Train Terminal Gare Pincourt Terrasse-Vaudreuil.

History 
In the 18th century, Pincourt was made up of 22 concessions and on lot 75, called Fief Moreau, owned by Valentin Moreau, there were plans to build a windmill, but they were never carried out. 2    
This lot 75 became later on in the 1940s the LaFlèche sugar shack. 1  It's that lot that Bellevue Estate Ltd purchased on December 29, 1955. The now defunct Steinberg's supermarket chain originally opened a store on this land in November 1960. Some years later, in 1963, a strip mall has been added by Bellevue Estate Ltd 1, adding a Woolworth and a Royal Bank branch. Three commercial buildings then occupy the site.

In the 1970s, Consumers Distributing took the Woolworth space and Steinberg's expanded the front store in 1977.

Early in 1980, the three buildings were demolished to be used as an extension the parking lot while 5 new buildings are built in the center of the lot.

Ivanhoe Corporation  bought the mall in 1990 and expanded it in 1991. The final expansion occurred in 1993.

In 1992, when Steinberg's went bankrupt, the store became Xtra, the discount supermarket division for the group at the time. However, when the company folded in May 1992, Provigo bought the space and its sister chain Maxi took the former Steinberg's/Xtra space. In 1993, the mall had huge improvements, adding many others stores, with Canadian Tire and Zellers as new anchors. 1

In 2002, Ivanhoe Cambridge sold Le Faubourg de l’île to Elad  Canada Operations Inc. However,  it was managed by Cogir.

In 2005, the Maxi moved to a bigger standalone location across the street to become a Maxi & Cie. Some stores including Shoppers Drug Mart, who moved from another space in the mall, took the space originally occupied by Steinberg's and an Urban Planet unit took the space formerly occupied by Shoppers Drug Mart. Énergie Cardio (now Éconofitness) moved in the space previously occupied by Maxi in 2006.

In 2011 Walmart moved in the space occupied by Zellers (1993-2011).

Groupe Quint and Group Mach jointly purchased Le Faubourg de l’île in April 2016.

Hart reopened its store in January 2016 and will be relocated inside the mall in 2017 so that the space may be converted into a Cinemas Guzzo in 2018.

The former Blockbuster space was also subdivided in 2017 to allow the operation of two restaurants: Ben & Florentine and Grillades Torino.

Walmart then closed in 2019.

As of 2019, plans made for the construction of Cinemas Guzzo have been cancelled.

Anchors and tenants 
This is a list of the major anchors and tenants at Faubourg de l'Île, organized by descending leased area.

Anchors 
Approximately 35 commercial tenants on the site

 Canadian Tire (confirmed)
 Vacant (69,773 sq ft or  6 482.12 m2)
 Hart (confirmed)
 Pharmaprix (17,362 sq ft or 1 612.98 m2)

See also 
 Pincourt
 Île Perrot
 List of largest shopping malls in Canada
 List of shopping malls in Canada

References 

1. The Town of Pincourt 50th Anniversary celebration brochure. Legal deposit - Bibliothèque et Archives nationales du Québec, 2010.
©Town of Pincourt and Société d’histoire et de généalogie de l’île Perrot, November, 2010

2. Chartier, Lise. "L'île Perrot 1765-1860. La fin de la seigneurie. Suivie de l'historique du terrier de 1817. Éditions Septentrion 2014.

External links 
· Official website

· Groupe Quint

· Groupe Mach

Shopping malls in Quebec
Shopping malls established in 1960
1960 establishments in Quebec